Marc-Antoine Rallier (born 2 December 1988 in Nantes, France) is a French rugby union player. He currently plays at hooker for Castres in the Top 14.

Honours

Club 
 Castres
Top 14: 2017–18

References

External links
European Professional Club Rugby Profile
Ligue Nationale De Rugby Profile

French rugby union players
1988 births
Living people
Castres Olympique players
US Colomiers players
Rugby union hookers